Maarten Buysman, also spelt Buijsman (1856 –1919), was a Dutch botanist, known for growing, cultivating, and selling plants from across Europe, the Americas, and Indonesia. He also introduced a significant number of plants from the Americas and Europe to East Java.

Botanical career
Buysman founded a botanical garden in the Dutch city of Middelburg, called the Hortus Plantarum Diaphoricarum or, in English, the Garden of Diverse Plants. This garden was run as a business, rather than as a tourist attraction. Buysman cultivated and sold plant specimens grown in the garden, under the title Herbarium Analyticum. To acquire plants which he then cultivated and went on to sell, Buysman relied on an international network of collectors from whom he received plant material from around the globe.

In 1906-1907, Buysman moved to the colonial Dutch East Indies, where he was employed at the Hotel Nongkodjadjar in the Pasaruan Regency. There, he set up an experimental garden, and continued to cultivate plants he received from foreign collectors. According to the Office of Seed and Plant Introduction, Buysman focused on introducing plants to Indonesia, and appears to have introduced some foreign species to Indonesia, such as Cecropia pachystachya, Salvia tiliifolia, Cenchrus tribuloides, Elymus repens, Bromus sterilis, and Bromus erectus, although not all of these species have persisted. Backer also ascribed the presence of non-native plants when he visited Nongkodjadjar in 1925, such as Salvia tiliifolia, Calyptocarpus vialis, Melampodium perfoliatum,  and Marsypianthes chamaedrys to Buysman's acclimation activities.

Although Buysman never named any plant species himself, he collected the holotype of Pseudophegopteris tenggerensis Holttum.  

While nothing remains of the nursery in  today, botanical specimens collected and distributed by Buysman are held in herbaria across the globe, including the National Herbarium of Victoria, the Herbarium of the University of Coimbra, 
Harvard University Herbaria, Brown University herbarium, and herbarium at Kew Gardens.

Publications
 M. Buijsman. 1883. De oorzaken van het klimaat in het algemeen en de klimaatsverandering in Europa in het bijzonder. Album der natuur. 32(1): 49- 60.
 M. Buysman. 1884. Het verschil tusschen kusten- en continentaal klimaat met betrekking tot den plantengroei. Album der natuur. 33(1), 346–354.
 M. Buijsman. 1898. Erythroxylon coca Lam.  Album der Natuur.  47(1), 249-253.
 M. Buysman. 1899. Ipecacuanha. Album der natuur. 48(1), 121–125.
 M. Buysman. 1899. Caoutchouc. Album der natuur. 48(1), 249–252.
 M. Buysman. 1899. Zingiber officinale Roscoe. Album der natuur. 48(1), 318–320.
 M. Buysman. 1912. Botanischer Garten in Nongko Djadjar bei Lassang (Ost -Java) Flora oder Allgemeine Botanische Zeitung 104(4): 384-386.
 M. Buysman. 1912. Kultuurproeven met exotische planten. Teysmannia. 13: 176-179.
 M. Buysman. 1916. Thunbergia gibsoni S. Moore. De Tropische Natuur. 5(9), 134–136.

References

1856 births
1919 deaths
Biology_in_the_Netherlands
Dutch botanists
20th-century naturalists
Plant collectors
People from Zaanstad